Live and Cookin', subtitled at Alice's Revisited, is a live album by blues musician Howlin' Wolf, released by Chess Records in 1972.

Reception

AllMusic reviewer Cub Koda wrote: "The 1972 live album Live and Cookin' at Alice's Revisited is a great document of Wolf toward the end, still capable of bringing the heat and rocking the house down to the last brick".

Track listing 
All compositions credited to Chester Burnett except where noted
 "When I Laid Down I Was Troubled" – 7:44
 "I Didn't Know" – 5:58
 "Mean Mistreater" (McKinley Morganfield) – 6:51
 "I Had a Dream" – 4:58
 "Call Me the Wolf" – 5:45
 "Don't Laugh at Me" – 5:07
 "Just Passing By" – 5:20
 "Sitting on Top of the World" – 8:03
Additional tracks on CD reissue
"The Big House" – 7:38
 "Mr. Airplane Man" – 7:31

Personnel 
Howlin' Wolf – vocals, harmonica
Eddie Shaw – tenor saxophone
Albert Luandrew – piano
Hubert Sumlin, Willie Williams – guitar
David Myers – bass
Fred Below – drums

References 

1972 live albums
Howlin' Wolf live albums
Chess Records live albums
Albums produced by Ralph Bass